Rifa and Southern Region ( Ar-Rifāʿ wal-Minṭaqat al-Janūbīyah) was a municipality of Bahrain in the southern part of the country. Its territory is now in the Central and Southern Governorates. Ar Rifa' wa al Mintaqah al Janubiyah's population in 2001 was 79,985.

References 

Populated places in Bahrain
Former municipalities (regions) of Bahrain